Work-time is the New Zealand equivalent of drivers' working hours, or time spent doing work-related tasks in an occupation subject to Land Transport Rule Work Time and Logbooks 2007, Rule 62001.

Work-time application
The rules are applied to drivers and transport operators and govern maximum periods of work time and minimum rest times. The rules apply if, at any time during a cumulative work period, a person drives or operates a vehicle that:
 requires a class 2, 3, 4 or 5 heavy vehicle driver licence, or
 is driven or operated in a transport service (other than a rental service), or
 is used in circumstances in which the vehicle must, or ought to be operated under a transport service licence, or
 is used to carry goods for hire or reward.

Exemptions
There are numerous potential exemptions to work-time requirements where any of the following applies. It is a:
 vehicle used within a 50km radius of its normal base of operations
 vehicle not used for hire or reward
 school bus
 police or army vehicle
 motorhome
 mobile crane
 vintage heavy vehicle
 special-type vehicle such as a forklift truck, road roller or roadside maintenance vehicle
 vehicle recovery service vehicle
 urban bus

Logbooks and time-keeping
All drivers of vehicles subject to work-time rules must keep one current logbook in the vehicle while driving. The logbook must be up-to-date to the most recent period of rest time. Drivers complete a logbook course as part of class 2 heavy vehicle licence training.

Paper logbooks are available in two variants:
 Heavy vehicle (vehicles over 3500kg)
 Small passenger service vehicle (e.g. taxi)
They are triplicate (employee) or duplicate (self-employed).
Each logbook sheet has a white top copy, a yellow duplicate for the employer and a pink copy that may be requested by enforcement officers.

Electronic logbooks are available and must be approved by NZ Transport Agency. They are seen as a way to avoid falsification of logbook records.

Completed logbooks must be kept for at least 12 months after the date of the last entry.

Work-time limits
Drivers and operators are permitted to work up to 5.5 hours before they must take a rest period of at least 30 minutes; taxi drivers taking short fares can work up to 7 hours before taking a break.
The maximum number of work hours before a minimum break of 10 hours is taken is 13. This is called the cumulative work day. Work-time can be extended through:
 unavoidable delays
 civil emergency
 essential repair work
 authorised work-time variations

The maximum number of work hours before a minimum break of 24 hours is taken is 70. There are no exemptions or exceptions. This is called the cumulative work period.

Secondary employment is counted towards the cumulative work day and cumulative work time.

References 

Road safety
Commercial vehicles
Trucks
Truck drivers
Traffic law